Telephone numbers in Puerto Rico are assigned under the North American Numbering Plan (NANP). Their area codes are 787 or 939.

Prior to March 1, 1996, Puerto Rico was one of many Caribbean islands served by area code 809.  On that date Puerto Rico was assigned the new area code 787 (with the mnemonic PUR or PTR).  Permissive dialing of 809 ended January 31, 1997.

Within only four years, 787 was already on the brink of exhaustion due to the proliferation of cell phones and dial-up Internet connections. To solve the problem, 787 was overlaid with area code 939 in or about September 2001, with ten-digit dialing required for all calls. A split had been ruled out in order to spare Puerto Ricans the expense and burden of changing their numbers for the second time in a decade, the island's extremely dense population, and the lack of a suitable boundary for a split. 939 is primarily used for cell phones.

See also

List of NANP area codes
Area codes in the Caribbean

References

External links
 List of exchanges in 787 Area Code
 List of exchanges in 939 Area Code

Telecommunications in Puerto Rico
Puerto Rico
Area codes in the Caribbean
Telephone numbers